Colorloss Record is an EP by the band Belong. Each of the four tracks is a re-interpretation of a different 1960s psychedelic rock song.

Track listing
"Late Night" - 3:32
"Beeside" - 5:11
"Girl From New York" - 3:38
"My Clown" - 6:41

Production and writing notes
 Produced by Turk Dietrich and Michael Jones
 Late Night written originally by Syd Barrett
 Beeside written originally by Dave McTavish (original version recorded by Tintern Abbey)
 Girl From New York written originally by Billy Nicholls
 My Clown written originally by Tom Newman (original version recorded by July)

References

External links
 MySpace Music page

2008 EPs
Belong (band) albums